Deschambault Lake  is a freshwater lake in the north-eastern region of the Canadian province of Saskatchewan. The identically-named community of Deschambault Lake resides on its shore.

Deschambault Lake is a large lake divided into two sections by the Deschambault Channel. The western section is known as Ballantyne Bay. While several rivers flow into the lake, Deschambault and Ballantyne Rivers are the primary inflows. Deschambault River begins at Wapawekka Lake and drains the nearby Wapawekka Hills. Ballantyne River begins at Big Sandy Lake and drains the Cub Hills. Deschambault Lake and its catchment are part of the Sturgeon-Weir River drainage basin. The Sturgeon-Weir River is a tribuary of the Saskatchewan River.

See also 
List of lakes of Saskatchewan

References 

Lakes of Saskatchewan